The 2019–20 West Coast Conference men's basketball season began with practices in September 2019 and will end with the 2020 West Coast Conference Men's Basketball Tournament in March 2020. This is the 69th season for WCC men's basketball, and the 31st under its current name of "West Coast Conference". The conference was founded in 1952 as the California Basketball Association, became the West Coast Athletic Conference in 1956, and dropped the word "Athletic" in 1989.

Head coaches

Coaching changes 
On March 26, 2019 Dave Rose announced his retirement after 14 seasons as the head coach at Brigham Young University. His career record at BYU was 348-135 with 8 seasons where his team qualified for the NCAA tournament. Shortly thereafter, Mark Pope, the head coach at Utah Valley University, was announced as the head coach at BYU. Pope had previously been an assistant coach at BYU from 2011-15.

In March 2019, Kyle Smith was selected as the new head coach at Washington State signing a six year contract after the previous coach Ernie Kent was fired. Todd Golden, an assistant coach at USF, was later named as the new head coach for the Dons. At just 34 years old, Golden became the 7th youngest coach in Division I history. Golden formerly played at Saint Mary's from 2004-07.

Coaches 

Notes:

 Year at school includes 2019–20 season.
 Overall and WCC records are from time at current school and are through the beginning of the 2019–20 season.

Preseason

Preseason poll

All-WCC Preseason Men's Basketball team

Rankings

Regular season

Early season tournaments 
All ten of the schools from the West Coast Conference participated in multiple-team events or early season tournaments. The following table summarizes the results of each tournament.

Conference matrix 
This table summarizes the head-to-head results between teams in conference play.

Player of the Week 
Throughout the year, the West Coast Conference named a player of the week as follows:

All-WCC awards and teams 
On March 3, 2020, the West Coast Conference announced the following awards:

Postseason

West Coast Conference tournament

NCAA Tournament

References